Masti may refer to:

 Masti (film series)
 Masti (2004 film), an Indian comedy thriller
Masti (2007 film), a Kannada movie
Masti-Kanthay Vala, Masti 2 and Masti 3, albums by Kamal Heer
Masti, Estonia, a village 
Ashok Masti (fl. from 2004), an Indian Playback singer
Masti Venkatesha Iyengar (1891–1986), a Kannada writer

See also